Jeffrey William Kellogg (born August 29, 1961) is a retired Major League Baseball umpire who worked in the National League from 1991 to 1999 and throughout both major leagues from 2000 to 2019. He wore uniform number 8, formerly worn in the NL by Hall of Fame umpire Doug Harvey from 1962 to 1992.

Umpiring career
Kellogg has umpired in two Major League Baseball All-Star Games (1997, 2009), eight Division Series (1998, 2000, 2003, 2007, 2008, 2010, 2011, 2014, 2016), six League Championship Series (1999, 2001, 2002, 2004, 2006, 2012), and five World Series (2000, 2003, 2008, 2010, 2014 - as Crew Chief ).

He was promoted to crew chief in 2010 and assigned Crew G with Larry Vanover, Jeff Nelson and Mark Carlson.

Notable games
Kellogg was behind the plate in  when Aníbal Sánchez threw a no-hitter. In both games, Miguel Olivo was the catcher.

Kellogg was the third base umpire for Mark Buehrle's no-hitter against the Texas Rangers on April 18, .

Kellogg was the home plate umpire for Trevor Hoffman’s 500th save on June 6, 2007, ending the game on a called third strike

Kellogg was umpiring at second base when Randy Johnson reached the 300 win milestone on June 4, 2009.

On April 27, 2012, in a game between the Baltimore Orioles and Oakland A's, Kellogg tackled a shirtless man who had run onto the field and slid into home plate at Oriole Park at Camden Yards after the man had eluded Baltimore police for nearly two minutes.

Kellogg was chosen to serve as the crew chief for the one-game Wild Card playoff between the Atlanta Braves and the St. Louis Cardinals on October 5, 2012.

Kellogg was the second base umpire when Albert Pujols of the Los Angeles Angels hit his 600th career home run against the Minnesota Twins on June 3, 2017.

Personal 
Kellogg resides in Michigan, and received a B.S. in Criminal Justice from Ferris State University in Big Rapids, Michigan.

See also 

 List of Major League Baseball umpires

References

External links
Major league profile
Retrosheet

1961 births
Living people
Sportspeople from Michigan
Major League Baseball umpires
People from Coldwater, Michigan
Ferris State University alumni